Purcell is a surname of Norman origin, and common in Ireland and England. It was given to those whose occupation was swineherd.

Notables with this name 

A. A. Purcell (1872–1935), president of the British Trades Union Congress and Labour Member of Parliament
Alban W. Purcell (c. 1843–1913), American stage actor, dramatist and manager
Albert Purcell (born 1913), English former footballer
Andrew Purcell, former professional rugby league footballer
Benjamin Purcell (1928-2013), American army officer and state legislator
Bennie Purcell (born 1929), former professional basketball player and collegiate tennis coach
Bernie Purcell, Australian rugby league footballer
Bill Purcell (disambiguation)
Blondie Purcell (1854–1912), American Major League Baseball player
Brian Purcell (1938–1969), Welsh professional footballer
Charmian Purcell (born 1979), New Zealand basketball player
Clare Purcell (1884–1964), American bishop
Daniel Purcell (1664–1717), English composer, younger brother to Henry
Darryn Purcell (born 1985), Australian lightweight rower
Debi Purcell, American mixed martial artist
Deirdre Purcell (born 1945), Irish author
Dick Purcell ((1905-1944), American actor
Dominic Purcell (born 1970), Irish-Australian actor
Edward Purcell (musician) (1689–1740), English composer
Edward A. Purcell, Jr., American historian
Edward Henry Purcell (died 1765), English organist, printer, and music publisher
Edward Mills Purcell (1912–1997), U.S. physicist, Nobel Prize winner
Father Austin Purcell, fictional character in the television comedy Father Ted
Francis T. Purcell (born 1918), former Republican politician
François Purcell, elected official from Montréal
Ganson Purcell, former chairman of the U.S. Securities and Exchange Commission
George Purcell, former English professional association football player
Gordon Purcell (born 1959), American comic book artist
Graham B. Purcell, Jr. (born 1919), U.S. Representative from Texas
Henry Purcell (1659–1695), English composer
Henry Purcell (judge), New York Supreme Court
Hugh Purcell of Loughmoe (12th Century), Irish Lord and politician
Howard Purcell (1918–1981), American comic-book artist and writer
Irene Purcell (1901–1972), American movie actress
Jack Purcell (1903–1991), Canadian world champion badminton player
James Purcell of Loughmoe (1609-1652), Irish Nobleman
James Purcell (politician) (1953-), Australian Politician
Jessica Purcell, American and Australian mathematician
Jim Purcell, former Chief of Police in Portland, Oregon
Joe Purcell (1923–1987), former Governor of Arkansas
John Purcell (disambiguation), several people
José L. Purcell, Puerto Rican Judge, founder-president Puerto Rican Volleyball Federation
Josh Kilmer-Purcell (born 1969), American writer
Kay Purcell (1963–2020), English actress
Kieran Purcell (born 1945), former Irish sportsman
Leah Purcell (born 1970), Australian actress
Lee Purcell (born 1947), American actress
Max Purcell (born 1998), Australian tennis player
Mel Purcell (born 1959), former professional tennis player and current collegiate tennis coach
Mike Purcell (born 1991), American football player
Nicholas Purcell of Loughmoe (1651–1722), Irish nobleman
Nicholas Purcell (MP) (died 1559)
Nicholas Purcell (Classicist) (?), professor of Ancient history
Noel Purcell (disambiguation)
Pat Purcell (born 1947), Australian politician
Patrick Purcell (1833–1891), Canadian railway contractor and political figure
Phil Purcell (hurler) (1900–1963), Irish sportsman
Philip J. Purcell (born 1943), Morgan Stanley CEO 1997–2005
Richard Purcell of Loughmoe (16th - 17th Century) Baron and Jury
Robert Purcell (1912–1991), American businessman and philanthropist
Ron Purcell, American guitarist
Sally Purcell (1944–1998), British poet and translator
Sarah Purcell (born 1948), American television shows host
Sarahbeth Purcell (born 1977), American author of fiction
Scott Purcell, founder of Epoch Networks
Seán Purcell (1929–2005), Gaelic footballer
Sharon Purcell, fictional character on the television drama Peyton Place
Steve Purcell, comic book artist
Steven Purcell (born 1972), Scottish politician
Thomas Purcell of Loughmoe (1538-1607), Irish nobleman
Tadhg Purcell (born 1985), Irish footballer
Teddy Purcell (born 1985), Canadian professional ice hockey right winger
Thomas Purcell of Loughmoe (1538–1609), Irish nobleman
Toby Purcell, Anglo-Irish soldier of the 17th century
Tommy Purcell (1921–1949), Irish sportsman
Victor Purcell (1896–1965), British colonial public servant, historian, poet and sinologist
William Purcell (disambiguation)

References